Aleksey Aleksandrovich Shchyotkin (born 21 May 1991) is a Kazakh football striker who plays for Russian club Kuban Krasnodar and the Kazakhstan national football team.

Career

Club
Shchyotkin left FC Taraz in December 2014, signing a one-year contract with reigning Kazakhstan Premier League Champions FC Astana in January 2015.

In January 2017, Shchyotkin joined FC Tobol on a season-long loan deal. After playing for FC Ordabasy during the 2019 season, Shchyotkin returned to Astana in January 2020.

On 13 January 2021, he signed with Russian Premier League club Rotor Volgograd.

International
Shchyotkin made his international debut on 14 August 2013 against Georgia in a 1–0 win, playing 69 minutes from the start.

Career statistics

Club

International

International goals
Scores and results list Kazakhstan's goal tally first.

Honours

Club
Astana
 Kazakhstan Super Cup (1): 2015

References 

1991 births
People from Taldykorgan
Living people
Kazakhstani people of Russian descent
Kazakhstani footballers
Kazakhstan international footballers
Association football forwards
FC Zhetysu players
FC Atyrau players
FC Taraz players
FC Astana players
FC Aktobe players
FC Tobol players
FC Ordabasy players
FC Rotor Volgograd players
FC Urozhay Krasnodar players
Kazakhstan Premier League players
Russian Premier League players
Russian First League players
Kazakhstani expatriate footballers
Expatriate footballers in Russia
Kazakhstani expatriate sportspeople in Russia